Fernando Daniel Moner (born 30 December 1967) is a retired Argentine football player.

Club statistics

External links
 Fernando Moner – Argentine Primera statistics at Fútbol XXI 
 Fernando Moner at BDFA.com.ar 

1967 births
Living people
Argentine footballers
Argentine expatriate footballers
Sportspeople from Buenos Aires Province
San Lorenzo de Almagro footballers
La Liga players
Atlético Madrid footballers
Expatriate footballers in Spain
Argentine expatriate sportspeople in Spain
Expatriate footballers in Japan
Japan Soccer League players
J1 League players
J2 League players
Yokohama Flügels players
Yokohama FC players
Atlético Tucumán footballers
Club Atlético Platense footballers
Unión de Santa Fe footballers
Club Atlético Huracán footballers
Association football defenders